Buttar Sivia is a village in the Amritsar district of Punjab, India. It is predominantly inhabited by people of the Buttar,   Sivia and Randhawa Jat clans.

Geography

It is located in the Baba Bakala tehsil of Amritsar district in the India Punjab. It is located on the Jalandhar-(Beas)-Batala road Mehta chowk is one of the famous landmark for Buttar while coming from the way to Amritsar. The great historical and holy city of Amritsar, lies to its west (41 km), Batala to its north (23 km) and the state capital city of Chandigarh to its far south-east (203 km).

Demographics

In 2001, Buttar Sivia had the total population of 5,623 with 1000 households, 2,995 males and 2,628 females. Thus males constitutes 53% and females 47% of the total population with the sex ratio of 877 females per thousand males.

Culture

The village is predominated by the very helpful and great nice people of Buttar, who believe in one God and really believe in humanity; people are very much peaceful under God's Shelter. Lohri is the most popular festival of the village and people celebrate this festival with great joy.  Youngsters are really very excited for this festival and they celebrate it in a full power way by banging the Dhol and with a loud music. People of Buttar are the glory of the village. The most significant feature of this village is that people do not judge anyone based on their casts and religions; they believe in brotherhood, respect and unity among each other. Agriculture is the most significant economic activity of the people. 
Punjabi is the mother tongue as well as the official language of the village.

Economy

As common in the region, the primary occupation for the villagers is agriculture, but many have gone overseas to find employment and elsewhere. The sugar factory, known as Buttar Sugar Mill, on the outskirts of the village is one of the main employers.

References

Amritsar district
Villages in Amritsar district